Alyssa Budhoo (born 9 December 1991) is a Canadian–Guyanese former footballer who played as a midfielder. She has been a member of the Guyana women's national team.

College career
Budhoo attended the Sheridan College in Ontario.

International career
Budhoo capped for Guyana at senior level during the 2010 CONCACAF Women's World Cup Qualifying qualification.

See also
List of Guyana women's international footballers

References

1991 births
Living people
Women's association football midfielders
Guyanese women's footballers
Guyana women's international footballers
Guyanese expatriate footballers
Guyanese expatriate sportspeople in Trinidad and Tobago
Expatriate footballers in Trinidad and Tobago
Canadian women's soccer players
Canadian sportspeople of Guyanese descent
Sheridan College alumni
Canadian expatriate women's soccer players
Canadian expatriate sportspeople in Trinidad and Tobago